, formerly known as , is a smart card using RFID developed by the Tobacco Institute of Japan (TIOJ), the , and the  for introduction in 2008. Following its introduction, the card is necessary in order to purchase cigarettes from vending machines in Japan.

The group announced plans for development of the Tobacco Card in 2001. The stated aim is to reduce smoking by underaged people. Testing began the following year, and a second round of testing followed in 2004. 

Details of the card were announced in 2005. The card incorporates an integrated circuit that contains information about the age of the holder. Card issuance is restricted so that only adults aged 20 and over may acquire the cards. The cards are contactless, so that vending machines will be able to read them without contact. The cards are able to store value, giving purchasers the option to pay by card or by cash. Users are able to add more value at vending machines.

Consumers can apply for the cards by filling out a form available at tobacco retailers and mailing it, along with a copy of a verifiable identification document (driver's license, health-insurance card, etc.) and a facial photo to TIOJ. No fees are required to obtain the card. Cardholders can cancel lost or stolen cards by contacting TIOJ to remotely disable the cards' use at vending machines. 

The final pilot program began in March 2008, and was phased in after that, becoming operational nationwide by 1 July 2008.

See also 
 Smoking in Japan

References

External links
Taspo official website 
Tobacco Institute of Japan 
Zenkoku Tabakoya 
Japan Vending Machine Manufacturers Association 

Contactless smart cards
Tobacco control
Smoking in Japan